The 1965 USAC Championship Car season consisted of 18 races, beginning in Avondale, Arizona on March 28 and concluding at the same location on November 21. This season was notable for the Hoosier Grand Prix, the first ever road course race for this series. The USAC National Champion was Mario Andretti and the Indianapolis 500 winner was Jim Clark.

Schedule and results

 No pole is awarded for the Pikes Peak Hill Climb, in this schedule on the pole is the driver who started first. No lap led was awarded for the Pikes Peak Hill Climb, however, a lap was awarded to the drivers that completed the climb.

Final points standings

Note: Bobby Johns is not eligible for points.

References
 
 
 http://media.indycar.com/pdf/2011/IICS_2011_Historical_Record_Book_INT6.pdf  (p. 260-265)

See also
 1965 Indianapolis 500

USAC Championship Car season
USAC Championship Car
1965 in American motorsport